Kaeng Khro is a district in the eastern part of Chaiyaphum province, northeastern Thailand.

History
The area was originally part of the Phu Khiao district. It became a separate district on 13 August 1959

The name of the district derives from the small river which flows behind the district office. Along the river bank many Ta Khro trees (Schleichera oleosa Merr.) grow. The people thus named the small river Kaeng Khro (kaeng แก่ง or แก้ง means 'small river').

Geography
Neighboring districts are (from the north clockwise): Phu Khiao and Ban Thaen of Chaiyaphum Province; Mancha Khiri and Khok Pho Chai of Khon Kaen province; and Khon Sawan, Mueang Chaiyaphum, and Kaset Sombun of Chaiyaphum.

Administration
The district is divided into 10 subdistricts (tambons), which are further subdivided into 125 villages (mubans).

Kaeng Khro